Oudon is a commune in the Loire-Atlantique department in western France.

Population

Gallery

Town twinning
 Batheaston, Somerset, Great Britain

References

See also
Communes of the Loire-Atlantique department

Communes of Loire-Atlantique